Gisèle Bosimba Eedja (born 10 April 1988), known as Gisèle Bosimba, is a DR Congolese footballer who plays as a defender. She has been a member of the DR Congo women's national team.

International career
Bosimba capped for the DR Congo at senior level during two Africa Women Cup of Nations editions (2006 and 2012).

See also
 List of Democratic Republic of the Congo women's international footballers

References

1988 births
Living people
Women's association football defenders
Democratic Republic of the Congo women's footballers
Democratic Republic of the Congo women's international footballers
21st-century Democratic Republic of the Congo people